Pimpode Budruk is one of the largest villages in Koregaon in the Satara District of Maharashtra state of India. Its population is around 9,000. The village has temples dedicated to Bhairava, Ganapati, Hanuman, and Ghumai Devi.

Schools 

Zilla parishad prathmik shala ( 1 -4)
Yashvantrao Chavan Vidyalay ( 5-10)
Bharat Vidya Mandir Wagholi (11th and 12th)

References

Villages in Satara district